The Progresso Associação do Sambizanga sports club has a women's handball team competing at the local level, at the Luanda Provincial Handball Championship and at the Angola National Handball Championship.

The club's major sponsor is the Angolan state-owned bank Banco de Poupança e Crédito (BPC).

The team made its debut at the Angolan Handball League in 2012.

Honours
National Championship:
Winner (0): 
 Runner Up (0) :
Angola Cup:
Winner (0): 
 Runner Up (0) :
Angola Super Cup:
Winner (0): 
 Runner Up (0) :
CHAB Club Champions Cup:
Winner (0): 
 Runner Up (0) :
CHAB Babacar Fall Super Cup:
Winner (0): 
 Runner Up (0) :
CHAB Cup Winner's Cup:
Winner (0): 
 Runner Up (0) :

Squad

Players

Managers

See also
Progresso do Sambizanga Football
 Progresso do Sambizanga Basketball
Federação Angolana de Andebol

References

Sports clubs in Angola
Angolan handball clubs
Handball clubs established in 2012
2012 establishments in Angola